Spaceplan is a 2017 clicker video game developed by Jake Hollands and published by Devolver Digital on May 3, 2017, for Android, iOS, macOS, and Microsoft Windows, a day earlier than its intended launch date of May 4. In the game, the player is stuck on a ship in orbit around an unknown planet, whose only power source is potatoes. The player must gather resources in order to unlock stronger tools, with which to increase their resource gathering abilities. The game received universally positive reviews from critics, who stated that its narrative sci-fi elements improved the otherwise simplistic gameplay.

Reception 
Spaceplan received an aggregate score of 89/100 for its iOS version. Carter Dotson of TouchArcade rated the game 100/100, calling it a "cool and engaging experience", and recommended it even to skeptics of the genre. Jim Squires of Gamezebo rated it 90/100, calling the game's narrative "funny" and "clever", but criticizing its short length. Christian Valentin of Pocket Gamer rated the game 4/5 stars, saying that "while the gameplay is what you'd expect from a clicker, the game is "uniquely enjoyable and humorous". Lauren Morton of PC Gamer commented that it "makes an argument for a new niche genre".

References 

2017 video games
Indie video games
Science fiction video games
Incremental games
Windows games
IOS games
Devolver Digital games
Single-player video games
Video games developed in the United Kingdom